Enfield is a town in Penobscot County, Maine, United States. The population was 1,435 at the 2020 census. There is also a large seasonal population with many cottages located on Cold Stream Pond, a lake within the town.

History
Enfield was first settled on the east bank of the Penobscot River about 1820, and was originally called Cold Stream. It was incorporated on January 31, 1835.

In 1891, four armed men boarded and attempted to rob a train as it passed through Enfield, shooting at the engineer, fireman, and conductors.  They also shot up the train station. They failed in their attempt to break into the mail-car, but it was a dark night and they escaped capture.

Geography

Cold Stream Pond

Cold Stream Pond covers the eastern side of the town of Enfield. There is a public boat launching facility on Old Hatchery Road off Maine State Route 188. A ridge creates a narrow portion of the pond separating a smaller northern basin from the larger southern basin. Summer oxygen concentrations often become unfavorably low in the northern basin. The most significant tributary is Smelt Brook draining Upper Cold Stream Pond and Little Round Pond into the northern basin from Lincoln. Cobb State Fish Hatchery is located beside the outlet using water from the pond to raise fish for stocking elsewhere. A self-sustaining native population of lake trout spawn in Webb Cove in the southeast corner of the pond. The lake trout forage on a population of rainbow smelt spawning in Smelt Brook. Atlantic salmon were introduced to the pond in 1876.

Demographics

2010 census
As of the census of 2010, there were 1,607 people, 650 households, and 461 families living in the town. The racial makeup of the town was 97.6% White, 0.1% African American, 1.2% Native American, 0.2% from other races, and 0.9% from two or more races. Hispanic or Latino of any race were 0.2% of the population.

There were 650 households, of which 27.7% had children under the age of 18 living with them, 58.6% were married couples living together, 8.2% had a female householder with no husband present, 4.2% had a male householder with no wife present, and 29.1% were non-families. 20.5% of all households were made up of individuals, and 9.1% had someone living alone who was 65 years of age or older. The average household size was 2.47 and the average family size was 2.85.

The median age in the town was 44.3 years. 20.5% of residents were under the age of 18; 7.6% were between the ages of 18 and 24; 22.8% were from 25 to 44; 32.4% were from 45 to 64; and 16.7% were 65 years of age or older. The gender makeup of the town was 48.3% male and 51.7% female.

2000 census
As of the census of 2000, there were 1,616 people, 612 households, and 463 families living in the town. The racial makeup of the town was 98.76% White, 0.06% African American, 0.19% Native American, 0.06% Asian, and 0.93% from two or more races. Hispanic or Latino of any race were 0.37% of the population.

There were 612 households, out of which 34.0% had children under the age of 18 living with them, 66.2% were married couples living together, 5.9% had a female householder with no husband present, and 24.2% were non-families. 18.6% of all households were made up of individuals, and 9.2% had someone living alone who was 65 years of age or older.  The average household size was 2.64 and the average family size was 3.00.

In the town, the population was spread out, with 26.4% under the age of 18, 6.6% from 18 to 24, 29.5% from 25 to 44, 25.2% from 45 to 64, and 12.3% who were 65 years of age or older.  The median age was 38 years. For every 100 females, there were 101.7 males.  For every 100 females age 18 and over, there were 100.8 males.

The median income for a household in the town was $36,458, and the median income for a family was $42,788. Males had a median income of $32,500 versus $22,614 for females. The per capita income for the town was $15,799.  About 10.1% of families and 13.5% of the population were below the poverty line, including 12.7% of those under age 18 and 18.7% of those age 65 or over.

Local schools
See MSAD 31

Notable people 

 Merle Fogg (1898–1928), stunt-pilot, namesake of the Merle Fogg Airport in Florida
 Matthew Mulligan, tight end for the Patriots

References

External links
 Town of Enfield, Maine
 Entry in Maine Encyclopedia

Towns in Penobscot County, Maine
Towns in Maine